Kurds in Switzerland are residents in Switzerland of full or partial Kurds origin. The Kurds in Switzerland mainly reside in the Cantons of Zurich, Aargau and Basel-Stadt and are descendants of migrants of refugees from the regions around Pazarcık, Kahraranmaraş or Erzincan.

Population 
In 2012 the Swiss authorities estimated that about 15,000 and in 2015, that ca. 19,000 Kurdish speakers were living in Switzerland. Its centre is the region around Basel, where in 2010 it was assumed that 12'000 Kurds reside.

Political representation

Basel 
There are several politicians of Kurdish origin in Switzerland. From Canton Basel-Stadt, two members of the National Council, (the lower chamber of the Swiss Parliament), Mustafa Atici from the Social Democratic Party (SP) and Sibel Arslan from the party Basta! are of Kurdish origin. In the Grand Council of Basel-Stadt five members are of Kurdish origin. Bülent Pekerman presides over the Grand Council since February 2023. During the Turkish invasion of Afrin, Syria the Grand Council of Basel-Stadt issued a resolution in strong terms, demanding the diplomatic intervention by Switzerland who is the depository of the Geneva Convention and the host of the European seat of the United Nations.

Berne 
Hasim Sancar is a member of the Grand Council of Berne.

Political activism 
If the Kurds rights are violated like during the suppression by the Turkish authorities of the hunger strikes in Turkish prisons in December 2000 or the Turkish invasion into North East Syria in 2019 there are often organized manifestations in support of the Kurds.

Organizations

Dem-Kurd 
Dem-Kurd is an organization that provides with an education in Kurdish cultural heritage which in their country of origin they are often not able to access. Dem Kurd is organized into several commissions concerning to media, language, music and women.

Kurdish Red Crescent 
The Swiss branch the Kurdish Red Crescent has its seat in Lausanne, at the shores of Lake Geneva.

In popular culture 
The movie Journey of Hope by Xavier Koller has portrayed the flight of a Kurdish family into Switzerland and was awarded an Oscar in 1991.

References  

Kurdish diaspora in Europe
Swiss people of Kurdish descent